Shelley King (born 25 September 1955) is a British actress, known for her roles as Jay Harper on the BBC drama series Angels and Yasmeen Nazir on the ITV soap opera Coronation Street.

Early and personal life
King was born in Calcutta, India in 1955 to Kelly King, a photographer in India and the UK. Although she is of British and Indian heritage she is unable to speak any of the languages of India. She grew up in New Malden, Surrey, and attended Coombe Girls School. In April 2018, during an interview on ITV's This Morning, King opened up about being a gay woman and discussed her own struggles and difficulties which she had with her own sexuality. While appearing in Angels, King was in her mid–20s, and producers of Angels wanted to make her character gay, but due to struggling with her own sexuality, she declined. She also revealed that at that time, she was turned away from entering a lesbian club due to them not believing that she was gay. King is in a civil partnership with Trilby James.

Career
King made her television debut in the BBC drama series Angels as Jay Harper in 1975. She remained in the series until 1980, after which she appeared in various British television series including The Jewel in the Crown, Tandoori Nights, King of the Ghetto and The Demon Headmaster. In 2010, she appeared as Nakuru Kapur, in an episode of The Bill, titled, “Intervention”..Then in 2014, King made her debut appearance as Yasmeen Nazir in the ITV soap opera Coronation Street. Her character began featuring in a high-profile coercive control storyline from May 2019 with her on-screen husband Geoff Metcalfe (Ian Bartholomew).

Filmography

References

External links
 
 
 

1955 births
Living people
Actresses from Kolkata
Anglo-Indian people
British people of Anglo-Indian descent
British actresses of Indian descent
English actresses of South Asian descent
English people of Portuguese descent
English people of Irish descent
English people of Scottish descent
English film actresses
English soap opera actresses
English television actresses
English stage actresses
British lesbian actresses
English LGBT entertainers
20th-century British actresses
21st-century British actresses